Mokalik is a 2019 Nigerian bilingual comedy drama film produced and directed by veteran filmmaker Kunle Afolayan. The film stars newcomer Toni Afolayan in the male lead role along with Femi Adebayo. The film had its theatrical release on 31 May 2019 and received extremely positive reviews from critics while also performing well at the box office. It was acquired by Netflix in July 2019 and was streamed on 1 September 2019. The film has been included as a part of "Made in Africa" collection in May 2020 by Netflix to be streamed amid the global COVID-19 pandemic. The film was also nominated for the Best Film category during the 2019 Durban International Film Festival. The film was also premiered in several film festivals.

Cast 

 Toni Afolayan as Ponmile
 Femi Adebayo as Mr. Ogidan
 Wale Akorede as Baba Nepa
 Charles Okocha as Emeka
 Halimat Adegbola as Mama Goke
 Tobi Bakre as Goke
 Simi

Synopsis 
The story revolves around a 11-year-old boy Ponmile (Toni Afolayan), who is from the middle class suburbs and spends the day as a lowly apprentice at a mechanic workshop in order to view and glance the life from other angles. When his father arrives to take him home Ponmile has to make up his mind if he wants to return to school or take on his apprenticeship for full-time on a long-term basis.

Production 
The filmmaker Kunle Afolayan cast his nephew Toni Afolayan in the main lead role who also eventually made his acting debut. Popular singer Simi also made her acting debut through this project and Tobi Bakre who participated in the Big Brother Naija (season 3) also made his acting debut. The film was predominantly shot in a mechanical village and also in Agege and Lagos. The post-production works were done in Nigeria. The film was shot with a special flexible cinema camera Canon EOS C300 Mark II camera. The film director revealed that this film was made with the intention of releasing it in Yoruba language as it was his first major film in the Yoruba language.

Reception 

Nollywood Post in its review praised the movie's accuracy "The drama, the mischief, the retail stores, the canteen, the graduation ceremony down to the costumes, excessive make-up use, and the chain of command in an environment like that was accurately portrayed."

References

External links 
 

2019 films
2019 comedy-drama films
Nigerian comedy-drama films
English-language Nigerian films
Yoruba-language films
Films shot in Nigeria
Films shot in Lagos
2010s English-language films